Allison Göhler (born Allison Carolina Göhler Cepeda, 17 December 1984) is a Chilean meteorologist and part-time TV host.

Biography

Life and studies
The daughter of a German father and a Chilean mother, Allison Göhler began her studies at Santa Teresita High School in San Antonio, Chile. At age 17 she moved to the city of Valparaíso with her family, starting her studies at the Faculty of Sciences of the University of Valparaíso, where she graduated from the Meteorology program. She has a postgraduate degree in Operational Meteorology from the Aeronautical Technical School. She has worked at the National Center for the Environment (CENMA).

Television debut as dancer
In 1999, she first appeared on television as the double of Marie Serneholt of the group A-Teens in a doubling contest on TVN's Buenos Días a Todos. Later, she was a member of the Groupo X dance troupe on the Chilevisión program . In 2000 she participated as a dancer on the Mega program , where she spent approximately 2 months.

Return to television as meteorologist
In early 2011, Göhler participated in a casting call for the presenter of the weather forecast for the new Canal 13 morning show Bienvenidos, where she was selected and gave the weather forecast all week. She was also on the special broadcast of the 2011 Santiago Marathon as its meteorologist, and co-hosted an edition of the program  along with Daniel Fuenzalida. She was on Canal 13 for approximately 4 months.

Later she worked on the morning program Mucho gusto with the weather forecast, and on  where she was a meteorologist, panelist, and journalist. In the summer of 2013, she arrived at TVN's Buenos Días a Todos morning program as a temporary replacement for Iván Torres. She worked as a journalist presenting real estate projects on the program Pabellón de la Construcción, broadcast on Chilevisión. From April 2013 to January 2014, she was part of TVN's  as the third host, giving the weather forecast a few days a month on TVN, TVN HD, 24 Horas, TV Chile (international broadcast), and TVN Internet.

Guachaca Queen
In 2011, she was invited by the newspaper La Cuarta to compete for the crown of  Queen on behalf of Canal 13 together with Claudio Palma, coming in third with a total of 10% (6,431 votes).

TV programs

References

External links
 

1984 births
Living people
Chilean people of German descent
Chilean scientists
Chilean women scientists
People from San Antonio, Chile
Television meteorologists
Women meteorologists
University of Valparaíso alumni